Acre is a surname. Notable people with the surname include:

Billy White Acre, Canadian film score composer, singer-songwriter, guitarist and record producer
Mark Acre (born 1968), American baseball player
Raynold E. Acre (1889–1966), American aviator

See also
Acre (disambiguation)
Acres (surname)

English-language surnames